The Six Days of Dortmund is a six-day track cycling race held annually in Dortmund, Germany. The event was first held in 1926 and the final edition in 2008.

Palmares

References

Cycle races in Germany
Sport in Dortmund
Six-day races
Recurring sporting events established in 1926
1926 establishments in Germany
Defunct cycling races in Germany
Recurring sporting events disestablished in 2008
2008 disestablishments in Germany